Holly Black (née Riggenbach; born November 10, 1971) is an American writer and editor best known for her children's and young adult fiction. Her most recent work is the New York Times bestselling young adult Folk of the Air series. She is also well known for The Spiderwick Chronicles, a series of children's fantasy books she created with writer and illustrator Tony DiTerlizzi, and her debut trilogy of young adult novels officially called the Modern Faerie Tales. Black has won an Eisner Award, a Lodestar Award, an Award, a Nebula Award, and a Newbery honor.

Early life and education

Black was born in West Long Branch, New Jersey in 1971, and during her early years her family lived in a "decrepit Victorian house." She graduated from Shore Regional High School in 1990. Black graduated with a B.A. in English from The College of New Jersey in 1994. She worked as a production editor on medical journals including The Journal of Pain while studying at Rutgers University. She considered becoming a librarian as a backup career, but writing drew her away. She edited and contributed to the role-playing culture magazine d8 in 1996.

In 1999 she married her high school sweetheart, Theo Black, an illustrator and web designer. In 2008 she was described as residing in Amherst, Massachusetts.

Literary career

Modern Faerie Tales

Black's first novel, Tithe: A Modern Faerie Tale, was published by Simon & Schuster in 2002. There have been two sequels set in the same universe featuring different casts. The first, Valiant (2005), won the inaugural Andre Norton Award for Young Adult Science Fiction and Fantasy. By vote of Locus readers for the Locus Awards, Valiant and Ironside (2007) ranked fourth and sixth among the year's young-adult books.

The Spiderwick Chronicles

In 2003, Black published the first two books of The Spiderwick Chronicles, a collaboration with artist Tony DiTerlizzi. The fifth and last book in the series reached the top of the New York Times Bestseller list in 2004. A film adaptation of the series was released in 2008, of which Black was co-executive producer.

The Curse Workers

White Cat, the first in her Curse Workers Series, was published in 2010. White Cat was followed by Red Glove (2011) and the trilogy concluded with Black Heart in 2012. In 2011, Black stated that the Curse Workers books had been optioned by Vertigo Pictures and producer Mark Morgan.

Magisterium

In 2012, Scholastic acquired a five-book series written by Black and Cassandra Clare to be called Magisterium. Its first volume, The Iron Trial, was published on September 9, 2014. The final book in the series, The Golden Tower, was published in 2018.

The Folk of the Air

The Cruel Prince published in 2017. The first book of The Folk of the Air was critically acclaimed and nominated for the Locus Award  and the Lodestar Award. The sequel, The Wicked King (2018) debuted at the #1 position of the New York Times Bestseller List. The Wicked King was also nominated for the Lodestar Award. The Queen of Nothing released in November 2019. With that release the series debuted at #3 on the New York Times Bestseller List.

Standalones

A standalone novel, The Coldest Girl in Coldtown, was released by Little, Brown in September 2013. Black published a short story of the same name in the vampire anthology The Eternal Kiss: 13 Vampire Tales of Blood and Desire. The Coldest Girl in Coldtown was a Nebula Finalist in 2013.

Doll Bones was published in May 2013, and was awarded a Newbery Honor and a Mythopoeic Fantasy Award.

The Darkest Part of the Forest was published in 2015.

Her first adult fiction novel Book of Night was released in May 2022 by Tor Books.

Black has also written dozens of short works and co-edited at least three anthologies of speculative fiction.

Bibliography

Adult novels
Book of Night (2022)

Young adult novels

Modern Faerie Tales
Tithe: A Modern Faerie Tale (2002)
Valiant: A Modern Tale of Faerie (2005)
Ironside: A Modern Faery's Tale (2007)

The Curse Workers
White Cat (2010)
Red Glove (2011)
Black Heart (2012)

The Folk of the Air
The Cruel Prince (2018)
The Lost Sisters (2018, companion novella)
The Wicked King (2019)
Queen of Nothing (2019)
How the King of Elfhame Learned to Hate Stories (2020, companion novella)

Books of Elfhame
 The Stolen Heir (2023)

Standalone
 The Coldest Girl in Coldtown (2013)
 The Darkest Part of the Forest (2015)

Middle grade novels
Spiderwick, Black and Tony DiTerlizzi
 The Spiderwick Chronicles 
 The Field Guide (2003)
 The Seeing Stone (2003)
 Lucinda's Secret (2003)
 The Ironwood Tree (2004)
 The Wrath of Mulgarath (2004)
Beyond the Spiderwick Chronicles
 The Nixie's Song (2007)
 A Giant Problem (2008)
 The Wyrm King (2009)
 Accompanying books
 Arthur Spiderwick's Notebook of Fantastical Observations (2005)
 Arthur Spiderwick's Field Guide to the Fantastical World Around You (2005)
 The Spiderwick Chronicles: Care and Feeding of Sprites (2006)

Magisterium, Black and Cassandra Clare, illustrator Scott Fischer 
 The Iron Trial (2014)
 The Copper Gauntlet (2015)
 The Bronze Key (2016)
 The Silver Mask (2017)
 The Golden Tower (2018)

Standalone
 Doll Bones (2013, Newbery Medal honor book), illus. Eliza Wheeler
 Heart of the Moors: An Original Maleficent: Mistress of Evil Novel (2019)

Graphic novels and comics

The Good Neighbors, illus. Ted Naifeh
The Good Neighbors: Kin (2008)
The Good Neighbors: Kith (2009)
The Good Neighbors: Kind (2010)

Lucifer
Lucifer vol. 1: Cold Heaven (2016, trade paperback)
Lucifer vol. 2: Father Lucifer (2017, trade paperback)
Lucifer vol. 3: Blood in the Streets (2017, trade paperback)

Short fiction

Collections
 The Poison Eaters and Other Stories (2010), illus. Theo Black

Short stories
"Hades and Persephone" (1997) in Prisoners of the Night
"The Night Market" (2004) in The Faery Reel: Tales from a Twilight Realm
"Heartless" (2005) in Young Warriors: Stories of Strength
"Going Ironside" (2007) in Endicott Journal of Mythic Arts 
"In Vodka Veritas" (2007) in 21 Proms
"Reversal of Fortune" (2007) in The Coyote Road: Trickster Tales
"The Poison Eaters" (2007), The Restless Dead: Ten Original Stories of the Supernatural, ed. Deborah Noyes
"Paper Cuts Scissors" (October 2007) in Realms of Fantasy 
"The Coat of Stars" (2007) in So Fey
"Virgin" (2008) in Magic in the Mirrorstone
"The Boy Who Cried Wolf" (2009) in Troll's Eye View: A Book of Villainous Tales
"The Coldest Girl in Coldtown" (2009) in The Eternal Kiss: 13 Vampire Tales of Blood and Desire
"A Very Short Story" (2009) in Half-Minute Horrors
"The Dog King" (2010) in The Poison Eaters and Other Stories
"The Land of Heart's Desire" (2010) in The Poison Eaters and Other Stories
"The Arn Thompson Classification Review" (2010) in Full Moon City
"Sobek" (2010) in Wings of Fire
"Lot 558: Shadow of My Nephew by Wells, Charlotte" (2011) in The Thackery T. Lambshead Cabinet of Curiosities. 
"Everything Amiable and Obliging" (2011) in Steampunk!
"The Perfect Dinner Party" (with Cassandra Clare, 2011) in Teeth
"The Rowan Gentleman" (with Cassandra Clare, 2011) in Welcome to Bordertown
"Noble Rot" (2011) in Naked City: New Tales of Urban Fantasy
"Coat of Stars" (2012) in Bloody Fabulous
"Little Gods" (2012) in Under My Hat: Tales from the Cauldron
"Millcara" (2013) in Rags & Bones: New Twists on Timeless Tales
"Sisters Before Misters" (2014) (with Sarah Rees Brennan and Cassandra Clare) in Dark Duets: All-New Tales of Horror and Dark Fantasy
"Ten Rules for Being an Intergalactic Smuggler (the Successful Kind)" (2014) in Monstrous Affections: An Anthology of Beastly Tales
"1UP" (2015) in Press Start to Play

Anthologies edited
 Geektastic: Stories from the Nerd Herd (2009), eds. Black and Cecil Castellucci
 Zombies vs. Unicorns (2010), eds. Black and Justine Larbalestier
 Welcome to Bordertown (2011), eds. Black and Ellen Kushner

Poetry
"The Third Third: Israfel's Tale" (1996) in d8 Magazine
"Bone Mother" (Autumn 2004) in Endicott Journal of Mythic Arts

Awards 

 2006: Andre Norton Award for Young Adult Science Fiction and Fantasy, Valiant: A Modern Tale of Faerie 
 2014: Mythopoeic Fantasy Award in Children's Literature, Doll Bones
 2014: Newbery Medal Honor Book, Doll Bones
 2015: Indies Choice Book Award—Young Adult Book of the Year, The Darkest Part of the Forest

References

External links
 

1971 births
Living people
American children's writers
American fantasy writers
American magazine editors
Female comics writers
Writers from Amherst, Massachusetts
People from West Long Branch, New Jersey
Rutgers University alumni
The College of New Jersey alumni
Women science fiction and fantasy writers
21st-century American novelists
American women novelists
Novelists from New Jersey
Novelists from Massachusetts
American women children's writers
21st-century American women writers
American women non-fiction writers
21st-century American non-fiction writers
Women magazine editors